The Financial Services Trade and Investment Board (FSTIB) is part of HM Treasury and is a partnership between the UK Government and industry. The Board meets on a quarterly basis to develop high-growth initiatives such as Renminbi internationalisation, green finance and financial technology. Its aim is to strengthen Britain's position as the centre of global finance and deliver jobs and growth across the country.

The FSTIB works closely with the Financial Services Organisation (FSO). The FSO is a key delivery partner for the FSTIB's initiatives.

History 
The FSTIB was formed by Chancellor George Osborne in Budget 2013 to promote the UK's financial services industry. The Board first met on 8 October 2013 and was charged with leading the government's drive to promote external trade, attract inward investment and lift market access barriers for the UK's financial services sector.

In July 2015, the Chancellor re-launched the FSTIB with a new board composed of senior representatives from across government and industry.

Achievements 
 establishing the UK as the centre for Renminbi business outside China
 developing the UK as a western hub for Islamic finance
 delivering the Investment Management Strategy to create a simpler tax regime for the sector
 launching the Insurance Growth Action Plan (GAP) to expand British insurers into key emerging markets
 cementing the UK's world-leading position in financial technology

Membership 
The Economic Secretary to the Treasury, Simon Kirby, chairs the quarterly board meetings.

Members include:
 Helena Morrissey, Chair, Newton, and Chair, Investment Association
 John McFarlane, Chairman, Barclays
 Inga Beale, CEO, Lloyd's of London
 Nathan Bostock, CEO, Santander UK
 Miles Celic, CEO, TheCityUK
 Xavier Rolet, CEO, London Stock Exchange
 Sir Gerry Grimstone, Chairman, Standard Life
 Mark Garnier, Parliamentary Under Secretary of State, Department for International Trade
 Charles Roxburgh, Second Permanent Secretary, Financial Services, HM Treasury
 Deborah Bronnert, Director General, Economic and Consular, Foreign and Commonwealth Office
 Katharine Braddick, Director, Financial Services, HM Treasury
 Rob Ward, Deputy Director, Financial Services, HM Treasury

References 

2013 establishments in the United Kingdom